The 2006 Westchester County tornado was the strongest and largest tornado in Westchester County, New York since the 1904 Chappaqua tornado. It touched down there on Wednesday, July 12, 2006 and traveled  into southwestern Connecticut during a 33-minute span through two states. Coming ashore, the tornado entered Westchester County and struck the town of Sleepy Hollow at F1 intensity. After passing through the town, it intensified into an F2 tornado and grew to almost a quarter of a mile (400 m) in diameter. The tornado continued through the county, damaging numerous structures, until it crossed into Connecticut at 4:01 p.m. EDT (20:01 UTC). Not long after entering the state, it dissipated in the town of Greenwich at 4:03 p.m. EDT (20:03 UTC). When the tornado entered Westchester County, it was the eighth known tornado to either touch down or enter the county since 1950.

Two barns and a warehouse were destroyed, and a large stained-glass window was shattered. Numerous homes and businesses were damaged and thousands of trees were uprooted. There were no fatalities and only six minor injuries were associated with the storm. The cost of damages was estimated at $12.1 million.

Meteorological synopsis

On July 12 a supercell thunderstorm developed over eastern New Jersey in association with a surface low-pressure area in southwestern Ontario. Daytime heating in the Tri-State Region led to moderate instability, a key factor in the development of showers and thunderstorms. With conditions favorable for the development of a tornado, the Storm Prediction Center issued a tornado watch at 12:40 p.m. EDT (16:40 UTC). A strong thunderstorm developed around 2:00 p.m. EDT (18:00 UTC) which produced a funnel cloud near Carlstadt at around 2:45 p.m. EDT (18:45 UTC), although no damage was associated with the funnel. That same storm intensified and developed into a supercell as it crossed into New York. About 15 minutes later, a tornado warning was issued for southern Rockland and Westchester counties, which would remain in effect until 4:15 p.m. EDT (21:15 UTC).  At around 3:30 p.m. EDT (19:30 UTC), an F1 tornado touched down near Grand View-on-Hudson along the Hudson River in Rockland County. The 100 yard (91 m) wide tornado touched down on a dock before becoming a waterspout as it took a  path across the river. The tornado passed near the Tappan Zee Bridge before crossing into Westchester County. Upon entering Westchester, it was the eighth tornado ever recorded in the county.

The tornado hit the town of Sleepy Hollow, New York, around 3:37 p.m. EDT (19:37 UTC); two minutes later, a  wind gust was reported along the periphery of the tornado. At the time, the tornado was estimated to be 300 yd (274 m) wide and was the strongest tornado ever recorded in Westchester County. Shortly after, it weakened back to F1 intensity. Minor damage was reported through the Kensico Reservoir in Valhalla as the tornado neared the New York–Connecticut border. After crossing the state border into Fairfield County, Connecticut, it weakened further before lifting at 4:03 p.m  EDT (20:03 UTC) in Greenwich after traveling  in Connecticut. Another brief touchdown may have occurred shortly after near the Merritt Parkway. Overall, the tornado tracked across a total of  through two states over a period over 33 minutes.

Impact

The tornado took a path through Rockland, Westchester and Fairfield counties, downing or uprooting thousands of trees and damaging several structures, including significant structural damage to the California Closets warehouse. Six minor injuries were also reported. In all, the tornado inflicted $12.1 million in damage.

Minor damage was reported in Rockland County. One dock and one boat were damaged by the tornado. After crossing the Hudson River, the tornado entered Westchester County, where the worst of the damage took place. It struck the town of Sleepy Hollow, damaging roofs and tearing the siding off numerous homes and businesses. A 10-foot (3 m) tall stained-glass window in the St. Teresa of Avila Church was shattered. Afterwards, the town of Pocantico Hills was struck as the tornado intensified to F2 intensity. Several trees were uprooted and two barns were destroyed. The California Closet Warehouse suffered severe structural damage; two concrete walls were destroyed. An interior staircase, which employees used as a shelter, collapsed causing four injuries. Concrete blocks from the building were blown about, some of which struck cars in a nearby parking lot. A nearby Comfort Inn had part of its roof torn off. After a tornado warning was issued, a school near the warehouse was evacuated.

As the tornado crossed New York State Route 9A, it picked up a state trooper car and flipped it several times before it fell to the ground; the officer inside suffered only minor injuries. Moving towards the east-northeast, the tornado struck the towns of Mount Pleasant and Hawthorne, damaging numerous trees and causing minor structural damage. Damage along the Saw Mill River Parkway prompted officials to shut down a section of the highway near Mount Pleasant.  Trees fell on streets and railroad tracks, halting Metro-North Railroad service and creating major traffic delays. After passing by the Kensico Reservoir in Valhalla, the tornado crossed into Connecticut, where it knocked down numerous power lines, cutting power to about 10,000 residences in the county. In all, six people sustained minor injuries and damages amounted to $10.1 million.

The weakening tornado ended its duration in Fairfield County, Connecticut, in the town of Greenwich. Thousands of trees were either uprooted or snapped along the tornado's  path through the state. Minor damage was inflicted upon several structures. The tornado left 1,700 residences in Greenwich without power and blocked six roads. Most of the damage was concentrated to the northwestern corner of the town. Damages in the state totaled to  $2 million.

Aftermath
In the wake of the tornado, the mayor of Sleepy Hollow declared a state of emergency for the entire village. Two hundred emergency personnel responded to the storm. ConEdison crews were sent out to repair downed power lines and clear roads. By the next night, power was restored to all but 600 of the previous 10,000 residences without power in Westchester County. Westchester County opened its Emergency Operations Center after the storm to respond to the event. Two days after the storm, many of the roads had been cleared and power was fully restored. A recreational path in Tarrytown, New York, was not expected to be open for another two weeks due to numerous fallen trees. Metro-North Railroad suspended trains on the northern part of the Harlem Line until 5:00 p.m. EDT (21:00 UTC) for the removal of debris on the tracks. Southbound passengers took buses while the tracks were shut down. All trains were back on schedule by 7:00 p.m. EDT (23:00 UTC).

See also
List of North American tornadoes and tornado outbreaks
List of Connecticut tornadoes
1900 Westchester County tornado
1904 Chappaqua tornado

References

External links

Westchester County
F2 tornadoes
Greenwich, Connecticut
Mount Pleasant, New York
Natural disasters in New York (state)
Rockland County, New York
Tornadoes in New York (state)
Tornadoes in Connecticut
Westchester County tornado
Westchester County, New York
Westchester County tornado
Westchester County tornado
July 2006 events in the United States